Quidlivun is a small depression on the surface of Pluto corresponding to the central caldera of Wright Mons, southwest of the Tenzing Montes and adjacent to Morgoth Macula. It was discovered by the New Horizons spacecraft in 2015 and informally named after the Inuit land of the dead on the Moon.

The name is a misspelling of the Inuktitut qudlivun "(those) above us", where souls go after being purified in the Underworld, adlivun "(those) beneath us".

References

Geography of Pluto
Surface features of Pluto